"Have You Ever Seen the Rain?" is a song written by John Fogerty and released as a single in 1971 from the album Pendulum (1970) by American rock band Creedence Clearwater Revival. The song charted highest in Canada, reaching number 1 on the RPM 100 national singles chart in March 1971. In the U.S., in the same year it peaked at number 8 on the Billboard Hot 100 singles chart. On Cash Box pop chart, it peaked at number 3. In the UK, it reached number 36. It was the group's eighth gold-selling single. In March 2023, the song surpassed one billion streams on Spotify.

John Fogerty released a live version of the song on his The Long Road Home - In Concert DVD which was recorded at the Wiltern Theatre in Los Angeles, California, on September 15, 2005. A music video was released for the band's 50th anniversary on December 11, 2018.

Meaning 
In his review for AllMusic, Mark Deming suggests that the song is about the idealism of the 1960s and about how it faded in the wake of events such as the Altamont Free Concert and the Kent State shootings, and that Fogerty is saying that the same issues of the 1960s still existed in the 1970s but that people were no longer fighting for them. However, Fogerty himself has said in interviews and prior to playing the song in concert that it is about rising tension within CCR and the imminent departure of his brother Tom from the band. In an interview, Fogerty stated that the song was written about the fact that they were on the top of the charts, and had surpassed all of their wildest expectations of fame and fortune. They were rich and famous, but somehow all of the members of the band at the time were depressed and unhappy; thus the line "Have you ever seen the rain, coming down on a sunny day?". The band split up in October the following year after the release of the album Mardi Gras.

In a literal sense, the song describes a sunshower, such as in the lyric "It'll rain a sunny day" and the chorus, "Have you ever seen the rain, comin' down on a sunny day?" These events are particularly common in Louisiana, Mississippi, Florida, Georgia, South Carolina, and Alabama, but less common in other parts of the United States, due to localized atmospheric wind shear effects.

Music video 
For the band's 50th anniversary in 2018, a music video was released for "Have You Ever Seen the Rain?" The video stars then up-and-coming actors including Jack Quaid, Sasha Frolova, and Erin Moriarty. Quaid and Moriarty would go on to star together in "The Boys." The video was shot in Montana by director Laurence Jacobs who described it as "a coming-of-age story" and "something distinctly real that encapsulated identity. Not teenage years, but specifically your early 20s when you're still growing and trying to become someone." The story, cowritten by Jacobs and Luke Klompien, is of "three best friends hanging in Montana until one of them moves away", and includes scenes of the cast "skipping rocks into the river", "driving through the countryside in a vintage red Chevy pickup truck watching the sunset and bonding by the fire." A behind-the-scenes featurette about the making of the video was released June 26, 2019, featuring interviews with the cast and director, and also shows dialogue between the actors.

Charts

Weekly charts

Year-end charts

Other charts

Certifications and sales

Bonnie Tyler version

Welsh singer Bonnie Tyler covered the song on her 1983 album Faster Than the Speed of Night. The track was released as the album's third single in June 1983.

Charts

Other cover versions

Boney M. covered the song on their 1977 album “Love for Sale”. This was later sampled in  Modjo's "Music Takes You Back".

Joan Jett and the Blackhearts covered the song on their 1990 album,  The Hit List.

Punk rock band Minutemen covered the song on their 1985 album 3-Way Tie (For Last).

Funk rock band Spin Doctors covered the song for the soundtrack of the 1993 film Philadelphia.

Rod Stewart included the song on his 2006 covers album Still the Same... Great Rock Classics of Our Time.

Willie Nelson and his daughter Paula Nelson covered the song for his 2013 album, To All the Girls...

Jonathan Clark also covered the song in 2018.

ALPHAMEGA covered the song in 2022.

Versions in other languages
Spanish
Laureano Brizuela – "Cerca de ti"
Ana Gabriel – "Ven a ver Llover"
Juan Gabriel – "Have You Ever Seen the Rain (Gracias al Sol)"
Karina – "Quiero saber"

Portuguese
The Fevers – Não Devo Mais Ficar
Gilberto e Gilmar – Não Devo Mais Ficar 
 VOLNEI da COSTA & TCHÊ BOYS – Eu não Sei
 KLB – Não Devo Mais Ficar
 Paulo Ricardo – Eu Não Devo Mais Ficar

References

Creedence Clearwater Revival songs
1970 songs
1971 singles
Rock ballads
1970s ballads
Songs written by John Fogerty
Song recordings produced by John Fogerty
Fantasy Records singles
RPM Top Singles number-one singles
Number-one singles in South Africa
Country ballads
Songs about weather